Chalcosia coliadoides is a moth of the family Zygaenidae. It is found in south-east Asia, including Sumatra, Burma, Annam, Malacca, Borneo, Bangka Island, Nias, Enggano and Java.

The wingspan is about 60 mm.

External links
Zoologische Mededeelingen 

Chalcosiinae
Moths described in 1862